This is a list of records and statistics of the UEFA European Championship.

Debut of national teams
Each final tournament has had at least one team appearing for the first time. A total of 35 UEFA members have reached the finals.

Overall team records

The system used in the European Championship up to 1992 was 2 points for a win, and 3 points for a win from 1996 onwards. In this ranking 2 points are awarded for a win, 1 for a draw and 0 for a loss. As per statistical convention in football, matches decided in extra time are counted as wins and losses, while matches decided by penalty shoot-outs are counted as draws. Teams are ranked by total points, then by goal difference, then by goals scored.

Notes

Former countries

Medal table
The Third place playoff has been removed since 1984, meaning the losing semi-finalists are both counted under bronze since then.

Comprehensive team results by tournament

Legend
 – Champions
 – Runners-up
 – Third place
 – Fourth place
 – Semi-finals
 – Quarter-finals
R16 – Round of 16
GS – Group stage
Q – Qualified for upcoming tournament
 – Did not qualify
 – Disqualified
 – Did not enter / Withdrew / Banned
 – Hosts

For each tournament, the number of teams in each finals tournament (in brackets) are shown.

Notes

Hosts
From 1960 to 1976 the host was decided between one of the four semi-finalists. Since 1980 the hosts have automatically qualified, except in 2020 when every country had to qualify through qualification. Germany will host the next finals in 2024.

Notes

Results of defending finalists

Active consecutive participations
This is a list of active consecutive participations of national teams in the UEFA European Championships.

Notes

Droughts
This is a list of droughts associated with the participation of national teams in the UEFA European Championships.

Longest active UEFA European Championship droughts
Does not include teams that have not yet made their first appearance or teams that no longer exist.

Longest UEFA European Championship droughts overall
Only includes droughts begun after a team's first appearance and until the team ceased to exist.

Notes

Countries that have never qualified

The following teams which are current UEFA members have never qualified for the European Championship.  is the only one of these teams which appeared in the FIFA World Cup.

Legend
 – Did not qualify
 – Did not enter / Withdrew / Banned
 – Co-host of the final tournament

For each tournament, the number of teams in each finals tournament (in brackets) are shown.

Notes

Former countries
East Germany played in eight qualification competitions before the reunification of Germany in 1990.

Notes

General statistics by tournament

Note: Matthias Sammer was the first player to officially win the MVP of the tournament.

Team: Tournament position

All-time

 Most championships 3, / (1972, 1980, 1996),  (1964, 2008, 2012)
 Most finishes in the top two 6, / (1972, 1976, 1980, 1992, 1996, 2008)
 Most finishes in the top four 9, / (1972, 1976, 1980, 1988, 1992, 1996, 2008, 2012, 2016)
 Most finishes in the top eight 10, / (1972, 1976, 1980, 1984, 1988, 1992, 1996, 2008, 2012, 2016)
 Most European Championship Finals appearances 13, / (every tournament since 1972)
 For a detailed list, see National team appearances in the UEFA European Championship
 Most second-place finishes 3, / (1976, 1992, 2008),  (1964, 1972, 1988)
 Most third/fourth-place finishes4,  (1976, 1992, 2000, 2004)
 Most fifth to eighth-place finishes 5,  (1980, 1988, 1992, 2004, 2012)

Consecutive
 Most consecutive championships 2,  (2008–2012)
 Most consecutive finishes in the top two 3,  (1972–1980)
 Most consecutive finishes in the top four 4,  (1960–1972)
 Most consecutive finishes in the top eight 7, / (1972–1996)
 Most consecutive finals tournaments 13, / (1972–2020)

Gaps
 Longest gap between successive titles 53 years,  (1968–2021)
 Longest gap between successive appearances in the top two 32 years,  (1968–2000)
 Longest gap between successive appearances in the top four 29 years,  (1992–2021)
 Longest gap between successive appearances in the top eight 32 years,  (1984–2016)
 Longest gap between successive appearances in the Finals 44 years,  (1972–2016)

Host team
 Best finish by host team Champions,  (1964),  (1968, 2020),  (1984)
 Worst finish by host team (24 teams) 17th–24th position,  (2020),  (2020),  (2020)
 Worst finish by host team (16 teams) 9th–16th position,  (2000),  (2008),  (2008),  (2012),  (2012)
 Worst finish by host team (4 teams) 4th position,  (1960),  (1976)

Debuting teams
 Best finish by a debuting team Champions,  (1960),  (1964),  (1968),  (1972)
 Best finish by a debuting team (after 1976) Semi-finals,  (1984),  (1992),  (2016)

Other
 Most finishes in the top two without ever being champions 2,  (1960, 1968)
 Most finishes in the top four without ever being champions 3,  (1960, 1968, 1976),  (1968, 1996, 2020)
 Most finishes in the top eight without ever being champions 8,  (1968, 1980, 1988, 1992, 1996, 2004, 2012, 2020)
 Most appearances in Finals without ever being champions 10,  (1968, 1980, 1988, 1992, 1996, 2000, 2004, 2012, 2016, 2020)
 Most finishes in the top four without ever finishing in the top two 2,  (1964, 1972)
 Most finishes in the top eight without ever finishing in the top two 2,  (1964, 1972),  (1992, 2004),  (2000, 2008)
 Most appearances in Finals without ever finishing in the top two 7,  (1992, 2000, 2004, 2008, 2012, 2016, 2020)
 Most finishes in the top eight without ever finishing in the top four 2,  (1996, 2008),  (1984, 2000)
 Most appearances in Finals without ever finishing in the top four 6,  (1996, 2004, 2008, 2012, 2016, 2020)
 Highest winning record 51.3%,  (20 wins in 39 matches)
 Most played match 7,  vs  (1980, 1988, 2008, 2012 (2x), 2016, 2020)

Team: Tournament progression

All time
 Progressed from the group stage the most times 8, / (1980, 1988, 1992, 1996, 2008, 2012, 2016, 2020),  (1984, 1996, 2000, 2004, 2008, 2012, 2016, 2020)
 Eliminated in the group stage the most times 6, / (1992, 1996, 2004, 2012, 2016, 2020)
 Most appearances, always progressed from the group stage 8,  (1984, 1996, 2000, 2004, 2008, 2012, 2016, 2020)
 Most appearances, never progressed from the group stage 3,  (1992, 1996, 2020)

Consecutive
 Most consecutive progressions from the group stage 8,  (1984, 1996, 2000, 2004, 2008, 2012, 2016, 2020)
 Most consecutive eliminations from the group stage 3,  (1980, 1988, 1992), / (1992, 1996, 2004),  (2008, 2012, 2016),  (1996, 2004, 2008),  (2012, 2016, 2020),  (1992, 1996, 2020)

Team: Matches played/goals scored

All-time
 Most matches played 53, 
 Most wins 27, 
 Most losses 17, 
 Most draws 18, 
 Most matches played without a win 3, 
 Most matches played before first win 8, 
 Most goals scored 78, 
 Most goals conceded 55, 
 Fewest goals scored 1, 
 Fewest goals conceded 1, 
 Most matches played always conceding a goal 11, 
 Highest average of goals scored per match 1.67,  (65 goals in 39 matches)
 Lowest average of goals scored per match 0.33,  (1 goal in 3 matches),  (1 goal in 3 matches),  (1 goal in 3 matches),  (1 goal in 3 matches)
 Highest average of goals conceded per match 2.79,  (39 goals in 14 matches)
 Lowest average of goals conceded per match 0.33,  (1 goal in 3 matches)
 Most meetings between two teams 7 times,  vs  (1980, 1988, 2008, 2012 (twice), 2016, 2020)
 Most meetings between two teams, final match 2 times, / vs / (1976, 1996)
 Most tournaments unbeaten 5,  (1964, 1996, 2008, 2012, 2020)
 Most tournaments eliminated without having lost a match 3,  (1996, 2012, 2020)
 Most tournaments eliminated without having won a match (since 1980) 4,  (1984, 1996, 2008, 2016)
 Most matches played with tournament champion 5,  (1984, 2000, 2004 (twice), 2012)

Single tournament
 Most wins 5,  (1984, out of 5),  (2000, out of 6),  (2008, out of 6),  (2016, out of 7),  (2020, out of 7),  (2020, out of 7)
 Fewest wins, champions (since 1980) 2,  (1992, out of 5)
 Fewest wins in regulation time, champions (since 1980) 1,  (2016, out of 7)
 Most matches not won, champions 4,  (2016, out of 7)
 Most wins by non-champion 5,  (2016, out of 7),  (2020, out of 7)
 Most matches not won 4,  (1996, out of 6),  (2004, out of 5),  (2012, out of 6),  (2016, out of 7),  (2020, out of 6)
 Most draws 4,  (2016, out of 7),  (2020, out of 6)
 Most losses 3,  (1984),  (1988),  (1988),  (1996),  (1996),  (2000),  (2004),  (2008),  (2012),  (2012),  (2016),  (2016),  (2020),  (2020),  (2020),  (2020)
 Most losses, champions 1,  (1988),  (1992),  (2000),  (2004)
 Most goals scored 14,  (1984)
 Most goals scored, group stage (since 1980) 9,  (1984),  (2008)
 Fewest goals scored 0,  (1968),  (1996),  (2000),  (2016)
 Fewest goals conceded 1,  (1980),  (2000),  (2012)
 Most goals conceded 13,  (2000)
 Most goals conceded, group stage (since 1980) 10,  (1984)
 Most minutes without conceding a goal 509,  (2012)
 Highest goal difference +11,  (2012)

 Lowest goal difference −8,  (1984),  (2000),  (2004),  (2012)
 Lowest goal difference, champions +2,  (1964),  (1968),  (1976),  (1992)
 Highest average of goals scored per match 2.80,  (1984)
 Highest average goal difference per match (since 1980) +2,  (1984)

 Most goals scored, champions 14,  (1984)
 Fewest goals scored, champions (since 1980) 6,  (1980),  (1992)
 Fewest goals scored, finalists (since 1980) 4,  (1980)
 Fewest goals conceded, champions (since 1980) 1,  (2012)
 Most goals conceded, champions 7,  (2000)
 Lowest average of goals scored per match, champions 1.17,  (2004, 7 goals in 6 matches)

Streaks
 Most consecutive successful qualification attempts 7,  (1992–2020)
 Most consecutive failed qualification attempts 15,  (all 1964–2020)
 Most consecutive wins 5, from 1–0 vs Denmark (1984) to 2–0 vs Spain (1984), from 3–1 vs England (1988) to 1–0 vs Scotland (1992), from 2–0 vs Denmark (2000) to 3–0 vs Denmark (2004), from 3–0 vs Turkey (2020) to 2–1 vs Belgium (2020)
 Most consecutive wins (qualifying and final tournaments combined) 15,  (23 March 2019 – 2 July 2021)
 Most consecutive matches without a loss 14, from 4–1 vs Russia (2008) to 3–0 vs Turkey (2016)
 Most consecutive losses 6, from 0–2 vs Italy (1968) to 2–3 vs France (1984), from 0–2 vs France (2012) to 2–3 vs Netherlands (2020)
 Most consecutive matches without a win 9,  /  / , from 0–2 vs Netherlands (1988) to 0–2 vs Portugal (2004)
 Most consecutive draws 4, from 0–0 vs Spain (2012) to 3–3 vs Hungary (2016)
 Most consecutive matches without a draw 17, from 1–2 vs Germany (1996) to 0–1 vs Spain (2016)
 Most consecutive matches scoring at least one goal 11, from 1–1 vs Germany (1996) to 1–0 vs Ukraine (2012)
 Most consecutive matches scoring at least two goals 9, from 3–0 vs Denmark (2000) to 3–1 vs Switzerland (2004)
 Most consecutive matches scoring at least three goals 3, from 5–0 vs Belgium (1984) to 3–2 vs Portugal (1984), from 3–0 vs Denmark (2000) to 6–1 vs Yugoslavia (2000)
 Most consecutive matches scoring at least four goals 2, from 4–1 vs Russia (2020) to 4–0 vs Wales (2020), from 5–0 vs Slovakia (2020) to 5–3 vs Croatia (2020)
 Most consecutive matches scoring at least five goals 2, from 5–0 vs Slovakia (2020) to 5–3 vs Croatia (2020)
 Most consecutive matches without scoring a goal 5, from 0–2 vs France (2012) to 0–1 vs Poland (2016)
 Most consecutive matches without conceding a goal (clean sheets) 7, from 4–0 vs Republic of Ireland (2012) to 3–0 vs Turkey (2016)
 Most consecutive minutes without conceding a goal 734,  (2012–2016)
 Most consecutive matches without conceding a goal (including qualifying) 8, from 0–0 vs Poland (1975) to 0–0 vs Belgium (1980), from 6–0 vs Bulgaria (2019) to 4–0 vs Ukraine (2020)
 Most consecutive minutes without conceding a goal (including qualifying) 784,  (1975–1980)
 Most consecutive matches conceding at least one goal 11, from 2–1 vs Sweden (2012) to 0–4 vs England (2020)
 Most consecutive matches conceding at least two goals 7, from 0–2 vs Italy (1968) to 3–3 vs Slovenia (2000)
 Most consecutive matches conceding at least three goals 3, from 0–5 vs Denmark (1984) to 3–3 vs Slovenia (2000), from 1–3 vs Portugal (2008) to 1–4 vs Russia (2012), from 3–3 vs Portugal (2016) to 0–3 vs Portugal (2020)
 Most matches played without consecutive losses 45,  
 Most matches played without consecutive wins 16, 
 Most matches played without consecutive draws 33,

Individual

 For records regarding goalscoring, see Goalscoring; for records regarding goalkeeping, see Goalkeeping
 Most consecutive finals 3, Rainer Bonhof (1972–1980)
 Most tournaments in squad 5, Iker Casillas (2000 (did not play), 2004–2012, 2016 (did not play)); Cristiano Ronaldo (2004–2020)
 Most tournaments played 5, Cristiano Ronaldo (2004–2020)
 Most championships 2, 13 players: Rainer Bonhof (1972 & 1980); Xabi Alonso, Iker Casillas, Cesc Fàbregas, Andrés Iniesta, Sergio Ramos, David Silva, Fernando Torres, Xavi, Raúl Albiol, Álvaro Arbeloa, Santi Cazorla, Pepe Reina (2008 & 2012)
 Most medals 3, Rainer Bonhof (1972 (champions), 1976 (runners-up), 1980 (champions))
 Most matches played, final tournament 25, Cristiano Ronaldo (2004–2020)
 Most minutes played, final tournament 2,153, Cristiano Ronaldo (2004–2020)

 Most matches won 12, Cristiano Ronaldo (2004–2020)
 Most appearances in a final 2, Valentin Ivanov, Viktor Ponedelnik, Lev Yashin (1960 & 1964); Franz Beckenbauer, Uli Hoeneß, Sepp Maier, Georg Schwarzenbeck, Herbert Wimmer (1972 & 1976); Bernard Dietz (1976 & 1980); Thomas Häßler, Thomas Helmer, Jürgen Klinsmann, Matthias Sammer (1992 & 1996); Xabi Alonso, Iker Casillas, Cesc Fàbregas, Andrés Iniesta, Sergio Ramos, David Silva, Fernando Torres, Xavi (2008 & 2012); Cristiano Ronaldo (2004 & 2016); Leonardo Bonucci, Giorgio Chiellini (2012 & 2020)
 Most appearances as captain 16, Cristiano Ronaldo (2004–2020)
 Most appearances in Team of the Tournament 3, Paolo Maldini (1988, 1996, 2000); Laurent Blanc (1992–2000); Cristiano Ronaldo (2004, 2012, 2016); Pepe (2008–2016)
 Youngest player to appear , Kacper Kozłowski (vs , 2020)
 Youngest player to appear in a final , Renato Sanches (vs , 2016)
 Youngest player to appear (qualifying match) , Martin Ødegaard (vs , 2016)
 Oldest player to appear , Gábor Király (vs , 26 June 2016)
 Oldest outfield player to appear , Lothar Matthäus (vs , 20 June 2000)
 Oldest player to appear in a final , Jens Lehmann (vs , 2008)
 Oldest player, winning team , Ricardo Carvalho, (vs , 2016)
 Oldest player to appear in a final winning team , Arnold Mühren (vs , 1988)
 Most matches played against the same team 5,  Giorgio Chiellini, vs  (2008, 2012 (twice), 2016, 2020)

Goalscoring

Individual
 Most goals scored in final tournaments 14, Cristiano Ronaldo (: 2 in 2004, 1 in 2008, 3 in 2012, 3 in 2016, 5 in 2020)
 Most goals scored in qualifying 31, Cristiano Ronaldo (: 8 in 2008, 7 in 2012, 5 in 2016, 11 in 2020)
 Most goals scored, including qualifying 45, Cristiano Ronaldo (: 2 in 2004, 9 in 2008, 10 in 2012, 8 in 2016, 16 in 2020)
 Most goals scored in a single qualifying competition 13, on two occasions:David Healy (2008 qualifying)Robert Lewandowski (2016 qualifying)
 Most goals scored in a single final tournament 9, Michel Platini (1984)
 Most goals scored in a final tournament match 3, on eight occasions
 Most goals scored in a qualifying match 5, on three occasions:Malcolm Macdonald (5–0 vs , 16 April 1975)Tibor Nyilasi (8–1 vs , 19 October 1975)Marco van Basten (8–0 vs , 19 December 1990)
 Most goals scored in a final 2, on three occasions:Gerd Müller ( vs , 1972)Horst Hrubesch ( vs , 1980)Oliver Bierhoff ( vs , 1996)
 Most matches with at least one goal 10, Cristiano Ronaldo (2004–2020)
 Most consecutive matches with at least one goal 5, Michel Platini (1984)
 Most matches with at least two goals 4, Cristiano Ronaldo (2012–2020)
 Most hat-tricks 2, Michel Platini (1984)
 Fastest hat-trick 18 minutes, Michel Platini ( vs , 1984)
 Most goals scored by a substitute in a final tournament match 3, Dieter Müller ( vs , 1976)
 Scoring in every match of the final tournament Viktor Ponedelnik (2 goals in 2 matches, 1960); Chus Pereda (2 goals in 2 matches, 1964); Gerd Müller (4 goals in 2 matches, 1972); Dieter Müller (4 goals in 2 matches, 1976); Michel Platini (9 goals in 5 matches, 1984)
 Most tournaments with at least one goal 5, Cristiano Ronaldo (2004–2020)
 Most tournaments with at least two goals 4, Cristiano Ronaldo (2004, 2012–2020)
 Most tournaments with at least three goals 3, Cristiano Ronaldo (2012–2020)
 Youngest goalscorer , Johan Vonlanthen ( vs , 2004)
 Youngest hat-trick scorer , Dieter Müller ( vs , 1976)
 Youngest goalscorer, final , Pietro Anastasi ( vs , 1968)
 Youngest goalscorer, knockout stage , Renato Sanches ( vs , 2016)
 Oldest goalscorer , Ivica Vastić ( vs , 2008)
 Oldest hat-trick scorer , Michel Platini ( vs , 1984)
 Oldest goalscorer, final , Leonardo Bonucci ( vs , 2020)
 Most penalties scored (excluding penalty shoot-outs) 3, Cristiano Ronaldo (2020)
 Fastest goal 67 seconds, Dmitri Kirichenko ( vs , 2004)
 Fastest penalty converted 118 seconds, Robbie Brady ( vs , 2016)
 Fastest goal by a substitute 1 minute, Alessandro Altobelli ( vs , 1988); Juan Carlos Valerón ( vs , 2004); Ondrej Duda ( vs , 2016); Ferran Torres ( vs , 2020)
 Fastest goal in a final 2 minutes, Luke Shaw ( vs , 2020)

 Latest goal from kickoff 120+2nd minute, Semih Şentürk ( vs , 2008)
 Latest winning goal from kickoff 120+1st minute, Artem Dovbyk ( vs  , 2020)
 Latest goal from kickoff in a final 113th minute, Viktor Ponedelnik ( vs , 1960)
 Latest goal from kickoff, with no goals scored in between 119th minute, Ivan Klasnić ( vs , 2008)
 Latest goal from kickoff in final, with no goals scored in between 109th minute, Eder ( vs , 2016)

Team
 Biggest margin of victory 5 goals, on five occasions: 5–0 , 1984 5–0 , 1984 6–1 , 2000 5–0 , 2004 0–5 , 2020
 Biggest margin of victory, qualifying match 13 goals:  0–13 , 6 September 2006, Group 4
 Most goals scored in a match, one team 6 goals:  6–1 , 2000
 Most goals scored in a match, both teams 9 goals:  4–5 , 1960
 Highest scoring draw 3–3, on four occasions: vs , 1996 vs , 2000 vs , 2016 vs , 2020
 Largest deficit overcome in a win 2 goals, on six occasions:, 1960 (coming from 1–3 and 2–4 down to win 5–4 vs ), 1976 (coming from 0–2 down to win 4–2 after extra time vs ), 1984 (coming from 0–2 down to win 3–2 vs ), 2000 (coming from 0–2 down to win 3–2 vs ), 2004 (coming from 0–2 down to win 3–2 vs ), 2008 (coming from 0–2 down to win 3–2 vs )
 Largest deficit overcome in a draw 3 goals: , 2000 (coming from 0–3 down to draw 3–3 vs )
 Most goals scored in extra time, both teams 3 goals, on two occasions: 3–2 , 1984 2–1 , 2020
 Most goals scored in a final, one team 4 goals:  4–0 , 2012
 Most goals scored in a final, both teams 4 goals, on two occasions: 4–0 , 2012
 Fewest goals scored in a final, both teams 1 goal, on three occasions: 0–1 , 2004 0–1 , 2008 1–0 , 2016
 Biggest margin of victory in a final 4 goals:  4–0 , 2012
 Largest deficit overcome to win in a final 1 goal, on three occasions:, 1960 (coming from 0–1 down to win 2–1 after extra time vs ), 1996 (coming from 0–1 down to win 2–1 after extra time vs ), 2000 (coming from 0–1 down to win 2–1 after extra time vs )
 Most individual goalscorers for one team, one match 5 individual goalscorers:  vs , 2020 (Pablo Sarabia, César Azpilicueta, Ferran Torres, Álvaro Morata, Mikel Oyarzabal)
 Most individual goalscorers for one team, one tournament 8 goalscorers: , 2012 (Mario Gómez, Lukas Podolski, Lars Bender, Philipp Lahm, Sami Khedira, Miroslav Klose, Marco Reus, Mesut Özil)

Tournament
 Most goals scored in a tournament 142 goals, 2020
 Fewest goals scored in a tournament 7 goals, 1968
 Fewest goals scored in a tournament (since 1980) 27 goals, 1980
 Most goals per match in a tournament 4.75 goals per match, 1976
 Most goals per match in a tournament (since 1980) 2.78 goals per match, 2020
 Fewest goals per match in a tournament 1.4 goals per match, 1968
 Fewest goals per match in a tournament (since 1980) 1.93 goals per match, 1980
 Most scorers in a tournament 80, 2020
 Most players scoring at least two goals in a tournament 30, 2020
 Most players scoring at least three goals in a tournament 13, 2020
 Most players scoring at least four goals in a tournament 6, 2020
 Most players scoring at least five goals in a tournament 2, 2000, 2020

Own goals

 Anton Ondruš, vs Netherlands, 1976
 Lyuboslav Penev, vs France, 1996
 Dejan Govedarica, vs Netherlands, 2000
 Igor Tudor, vs France, 2004
 Jorge Andrade, vs Netherlands, 2004
 Glen Johnson, vs Sweden, 2012
 Ciaran Clark, vs Sweden, 2016
 Birkir Már Sævarsson, vs Hungary, 2016
 Gareth McAuley, vs Wales, 2016
 Merih Demiral, vs Italy, 2020
 Wojciech Szczęsny, vs Slovakia, 2020
 Mats Hummels, vs France, 2020
 Rúben Dias, vs Germany, 2020
 Raphaël Guerreiro, vs Germany, 2020
 Lukáš Hrádecký, vs Belgium, 2020
 Martin Dúbravka, vs Spain, 2020
 Juraj Kucka, vs Spain, 2020
 Pedri, vs Croatia, 2020
 Denis Zakaria, vs Spain, 2020
 Simon Kjær, vs England, 2020

Top scoring teams by tournament
1960: , 6 goals
1964: ,  & , 4 goals each
1968: , 3 goals
1972: , 5 goals
1976: , 6 goals
1980: , 6 goals
1984: , 14 goals
1988: , 8 goals
1992: , 7 goals
1996: , 10 goals
2000:  & , 13 goals each
2004:  & , 10 goals each
2008: , 12 goals
2012: , 12 goals
2016: , 13 goals
2020:  & , 13 goals each

Teams listed in bold won the tournament.

Goalkeeping
 Most clean sheets (matches without conceding) 9, Iker Casillas (2004–2012)
 Most clean sheets, one tournament  5, Iker Casillas (2012), Jordan Pickford (2020)
 Most consecutive minutes without conceding a goal (finals) 519, Iker Casillas (2012)
 Most consecutive minutes without conceding a goal (qualifying) 644, Gianluigi Buffon (2010–2011)
 Most consecutive minutes without conceding a goal (including qualifying) 784 (including 8 consecutive clean sheets), Dino Zoff (1975–1980)
 Most goals conceded 21, Petr Čech (2004–2016)
 Most goals conceded, one tournament 13, Ivica Kralj, 2000
 Most goals conceded, one match 6, Ivica Kralj, 2000 (vs )
 Fewest goals conceded, one tournament, champions 1, of 3 matches Dino Zoff (1968); of 6 matches Iker Casillas (2012)
 Fewest goals conceded, one tournament 1, of 3 matches Dino Zoff (1968); of 3 matches Thomas Myhre (2000); of 4 matches Gianluigi Buffon  (2016); of 6 matches Iker Casillas (2012)

Coaching

 Most matches coached 21, Joachim Löw (2008–2020)
 Most matches won 12, Joachim Löw (2008–2020)
 Most championships No coach has won the title on more than one occasion
 Foreign championship  Otto Rehhagel (2004)
 Most consecutive tournaments with same team 4, Joachim Löw (2008–2020)
 Most consecutive wins 5, Michel Hidalgo (1984); Rinus Michels (1988–1992); Roberto Mancini (2020)
 Most consecutive matches without a loss 8, Rinus Michels (1988–1992); Vicente del Bosque (2012–2016); Fernando Santos (2016–2020)
 Youngest coach , Srečko Katanec ( vs , 2000)
 Oldest coach , Giovanni Trapattoni ( vs , 2012)
 Most championship wins as player and head coach 2, Berti Vogts, / (1972 as non-playing squad member; 1996 as coach)
 Most appearances as player and head coach 24, Didier Deschamps,  (1992, 1996 & 2000 as player; 2016 & 2020 as coach)
 Final appearances as both player and head coach 2, Dino Zoff,  (1968 as player, 2000 as coach); Didier Deschamps,  (2000 as player, 2016 as coach)

Refereeing
 Most tournaments 3, Anders Frisk (1996–2004), Kim Milton Nielsen (1996–2004), Cüneyt Çakır (2012–2020), Björn Kuipers (2012–2020)
 Most matches refereed, overall 9, Cüneyt Çakır (2012–2020), Björn Kuipers (2012–2020)
 Most matches refereed, one tournament 5, Felix Brych (2020)

Discipline

 Fastest sending off 24th minute, Eric Abidal,  vs , 2008

 Latest sending off 117th minute, Nuno Gomes,  vs , 2000
 Most sendings off (all-time, player) 2, Radoslav Látal (1996 and 2000)
 Most sendings off (tournament) 10 (in 31 matches), 2000
 Most sendings off (all-time, team) 4, 
 Most sendings off (match, both teams) 3,  (1) vs  (2), 1976
 Sent off in final match Yvon Le Roux,  vs , 1984
 Most cards (all-time, player) 8, Giorgos Karagounis (2004–2012)
 Most cautions (tournament) 205 (in 51 matches), 2016
 Most cautions (match, both teams) 10,  (4) vs  (6), 1996 (first round);  (6) vs  (4), 1996;  (6) vs  (4), 2000;  (6) vs  (4), 2016
 Most cautions (final match, both teams) 10,  (6) vs  (4), 2016
 Fastest penalty kick conceded 1 minute, Paul Pogba,  vs , 2016

Attendance
 Highest attendance in a final tournament match & highest attendance in a final 79,115,  vs , 21 June 1964, Santiago Bernabéu, Madrid, Spain, 1964
 Lowest attendance in a Finals match 3,869,  vs , 20 June 1964, Camp Nou, Barcelona, Spain, 1964

 Highest average attendance per match 59,243, 1988
 Highest total attendance (tournament) 2,427,303, 2016
 Lowest average attendance per match 19,740, 1960
 Lowest total attendance (tournament) 78,958, 1960

Penalty shoot-outs

 Most shoot-outs, team, all-time 7, 
 Most shoot-outs, all teams, tournament 4, 1996, 2020
 Most shoot-out wins, team, all-time 4, 
 Most wins, team, tournament 2, 2020
 Most shoot-out losses, team, all-time 4, 
 Most shoot-outs with 100% record (all won) 3, /
 Most shoot-outs with 0% record (all lost) 1, 

 Most successful kicks, shoot-out, one team 9 (out of 9), vs Italy, 1980
 Most successful kicks, shoot-out, both teams 17 (out of 18),  (9) vs  (8), 1980
 Most successful kicks, team, all-time 29 (out of 41), 
 Most successful kicks, team, tournament 10, 1996 (in 2 shoot-outs)
 Most successful kicks, all teams, tournament 37, 1996 (in 4 shoot-outs)
 Most successful kicks, player 2, Zinedine Zidane, Youri Djorkaeff, Bixente Lizarazu, Vincent Guérin, Laurent Blanc (1996); Alan Shearer, David Platt, Stuart Pearce, Paul Gascoigne (1996); Patrick Kluivert (1996–2000); Cesc Fàbregas (2008–2012); Cristiano Ronaldo (2004 & 2016); Nani (2012–2016); Robert Lewandowski, Arkadiusz Milik, Kamil Glik (2016); Fabian Schär (2016–2020); Mario Gavranović (2020); Gerard Moreno (2020); Leonardo Bonucci, Federico Bernardeschi (2020)
 Most kicks taken, shoot-out, both teams 18,  (9) vs  (9), 1980;  (9) vs  (9), 2016
 Most kicks taken, team, all-time 41,  (in 7 shoot-outs)
 Most kicks taken, team, tournament 11, 1996 (in 2 shoot-outs)
 Most kicks taken, all teams, tournament 42, 1996 (in 4 shoot-outs)
 Most kicks missed, shoot-out, one team 4, vs Germany, 2016
 Most kicks missed, shoot-out, both teams 7,  (3) vs  (4), 2016
 Most kicks missed, team, all-time 12,  (in 7 shoot-outs)
 Most kicks missed, all teams, tournament 14, 2020 (in 4 shoot-outs)
 Fewest successful kicks, shoot-out, both teams 4,  (3) vs  (1), 2000;  (3) vs  (1), 2008;  (3) vs  (1), 2020
 Most saves, all-time 3, Iker Casillas (2008–2012); Gianluigi Buffon (2008–2016); Unai Simón (2020), Gianluigi Donnarumma (2020)
 Most saves, tournament 3, Unai Simón (2020), Gianluigi Donnarumma (2020)
 Most saves, shoot-out 2, Francesco Toldo, vs Netherlands, 2000; Iker Casillas, vs Italy, 2008; Manuel Neuer, vs Italy, 2016; Unai Simón, vs Switzerland, 2020, Gianluigi Donnarumma vs England, 2020

Other
Taulant Xhaka and Granit Xhaka became the first siblings in European Championship history to play against each other, on 11 June 2016.

See also
 European nations at the FIFA World Cup
 Israel at the AFC Asian Cup

Notes

References

Records
 
All-time football league tables